The Art Club of Philadelphia, often called the Philadelphia Art Club, was a club in Philadelphia, founded on February 7, 1887, to advance the arts. It took on the same spirit as the Century Club of New York City: a comfortable, even opulent, place for member artists and art amateurs to work, stay, and socialize.

Its charter proclaimed:

The Art Club was one of the country's leading venues for solo and group art shows. Each year, the club presented a gold medal to the artist of an outstanding work, an art award that was viewed as one of the nation's most prestigious.

The club dissolved on November 9, 1940.

Building
The 1888 architectural competition to design the building was won by 27-year-old Frank Miles Day. His entry was selected over those of established firms such as Wilson Eyre, Cope and Stewardson, Willis G. Hale, Hazlehurst & Huckel, and others.

References

External links
Listing and photographs at the Historic American Buildings Survey
Photograph at Bryn Mawr College
Listing at Philadelphia Architects and Buildings

Organizations based in Philadelphia
Culture of Philadelphia
American artist groups and collectives
1887 establishments in Pennsylvania
1940 disestablishments in Pennsylvania
Arts organizations established in 1887
Buildings and structures demolished in 1976
Demolished buildings and structures in Philadelphia